"Lucy" is the debut single by the Divine Comedy, released in October 1993. Written by Neil Hannon and William Wordsworth, it is the only single from the album Liberation.

Lyrics
It is based on three of the Lucy poems by William Wordsworth. The song starts with "I travelled among unknown men", in which the poet tells us of his two-fold love for England and for an Englishwoman called Lucy. The second poem, "She dwelt among the untrodden ways", is about a woman the poet loved called Lucy, who is now dead. The last poem, "A slumber did my spirit seal", is about the deceased Lucy.

Personnel
Per A Secret History... The Best of the Divine Comedy's CD booklet:

 Neil Hannon – vocals, guitar, bass guitar, keyboards
 Darren Allison – drums, percussion
 Quentin Hutchinson – French horn

References

1993 debut singles
The Divine Comedy (band) songs
Songs based on poems
Songs written by Neil Hannon
Setanta Records singles
1993 songs